Donald Eugene Chambers (November 23, 1930 – July 18, 1999) was an American Marine, outlaw biker and founder of the Bandidos Motorcycle Club, in 1966 in San Leon, Texas. Chambers was convicted of murdering two drug dealers in 1972 and served a life sentence until his parole in 1983.

Biography
Chambers served as a Marine in the Vietnam War. Upon returning to Texas, he was employed as a longshoreman and became a member of numerous motorcycle clubs. Finding these various clubs too tame for his tastes, Chambers founded his own, the Bandidos, on March 4, 1966 in San Leon, Texas. He named the club in honor of the Mexican bandits who lived by their own rules, and chose the club's colors – red and gold – after the official colors of the U.S. Marine Corps. Recruiting members from biker bars locally in Houston as well as in Corpus Christi, Galveston, and San Antonio, the club had over one hundred members, including many Vietnam veterans, by the early 1970s. In 1969, Chambers oversaw the abduction, beating and handing-over to police of a Bandidos member who was wanted for a murder unrelated to club business which was drawing unwanted attention from law enforcement to the club. Chambers later moved to New Mexico after he was involved in a deadly shootout with a rival gang at a bar in East End, Houston, where they had gone to discuss a peace agreement.

On December 22, 1972, Chambers, along with fellow Bandidos members Jesse Fain "Injun" Deal and "Crazy" Ray Vincente, abducted drug dealer brothers Marley Leon Tarver and Preston LeRay Tarver in El Paso and drove them into the desert north of the city. There, the two dealers were forced to dig their own graves, after which the bikers shot them with a shotgun and set fire to their bodies. The brothers had sold baking soda to the Bandidos earlier that day, claiming it was amphetamine. Chambers, Deal and Vincente were convicted of the murders, with testimony given by Robert Munnerlyn, a club prospect and police informant who was an eyewitness to the event. The trio each received life sentences.

With Chambers in prison, Ronald Jerome "Ronnie" Hodge, another former Marine, was elected the club's new national president. Hodge was known previously as "Mr. Prospect," because he had earned his full colors in only a month, but once elected he went by the street name "Stepmother", in reference to Chambers street name "Mother". Donald's 23-year-old son Stephen Trammell Chambers died at Ben Taub Hospital after being shot in the head during an argument in the parking lot of a Houston night club, where his wife worked as a waitress, on November 3, 1979. A man charged with the murder, Leon "Stash" Dudley, allegedly fled Texas shortly afterwards and was apprehended in Euclid, Ohio in June 2016. The charges against Dudley were dropped in April 2017 after it was determined that the unidentified actual killer had been using Dudley's name and stolen social security number during the time of the murder.

Chambers was paroled in 1983 and retired from his club. He settled in El Paso, where he lived until his death from cancer at the age of 68 on July 18, 1999. Chambers is buried at Forest Park Cemetery in Houston beneath a large, flat grave stone inscribed with his name, affiliation with the Bandidos, and the quote, "We are the people our parents warned us about."

References

Further reading

External links
 

1930 births
1999 deaths
20th-century American criminals
American male criminals
American gangsters
American crime bosses
American people convicted of murder
People convicted of murder by Texas
Prisoners sentenced to life imprisonment by Texas
American prisoners sentenced to life imprisonment
Gangsters sentenced to life imprisonment
People paroled from life sentence
People from Houston
People from El Paso, Texas
United States Marine Corps personnel of the Vietnam War
Deaths from cancer in Texas
Bandidos Motorcycle Club